Mizrab is an album by Hungarian guitarist Gábor Szabó featuring performances recorded in 1972 and released on the CTI label.

Reception
The Allmusic review states "The music is well played but not particularly memorable".

Track listing
All compositions by Gábor Szabó except as indicated
 "Mizrab" - 9:35 
 "Thirteen" - 9:16 
 "It's Going to Take Some Time" (Carole King, Toni Stern) - 4:14 
 "Concerto #2" (Dmitri Shostakovich) - 7:20 
 "Summer Breeze" (Jim Seals, Dash Crofts) - 6:07 
Recorded at Van Gelder Studio in Englewood Cliffs, New Jersey in December 1972

Personnel
Gábor Szabó - guitar
Bob James - electric piano, arranger, conductor
Ron Carter - bass, arco bass
Billy Cobham - drums on "Mizrab" and "It's Going to Take Some Time"
Jack DeJohnette - drums
Ralph MacDonald - percussion
Marvin Stamm - trumpet, flugelhorn
Wayne Andre - trombone
James Buffington, Brooks Tillotson - French horn
John Campo - bass clarinet, bassoon
Sidney Weinberg - oboe, English horn
Hubert Laws - flute, bass flute, alto flute, piccolo
George Marge - oboe, clarinet, recorder
Max Ellen, Paul Gershman, Harold Kohan, Charles Libove, Joe Malim, David Nadien, John Pintaualle, Irving Spice - violin
Richard Dickler, Theodore Israel - viola
Charles McCracken, George Ricci, Alan Shulman - cello
Charles Israel - arco bass
Margaret Ross  - harp

References

CTI Records albums
Gábor Szabó albums
1973 albums
Albums produced by Creed Taylor
Albums recorded at Van Gelder Studio